In Estonia, the population of ethnic Russians is estimated at 315,000, most of whom live in the capital city Tallinn and other urban areas of Harju and Ida-Viru counties. While a small settlement of Russian Old Believers on the coast of Lake Peipus has an over 300-year long history, the large majority of the ethnic Russian population in the country originates from the immigration from Russia and other parts of the former USSR during the 1944–1991 Soviet occupation of Estonia.

Early contacts 
The Estonian name for Russians vene, venelane derives from an old Germanic loan veneð referring to the Wends, speakers of a Slavic language who lived on the southern coast of the Baltic Sea.

The troops of prince Yaroslav the Wise of Kievan Rus' defeated Estonian Chuds in ca. 1030 and established a fort of Yuryev (in modern-day Tartu), which may have survived there until ca. 1061, when the fort's defenders were defeated and driven out by the tribe of Sosols.

Due to close trade links with the Novgorod and Pskov republics, small communities of Orthodox merchants and craftsmen from these neighboring states sometimes remained in the Estonian towns of medieval Terra Mariana for extended periods of time. Between 1558 and 1582, Ivan IV of Russia (Muscovy) captured large parts of mainland Estonia, but eventually his troops were driven out by Swedish and Lithuanian-Polish armies.

17th century to independent Estonia 

The beginning of continuous Russian settlement in what is now Estonia dates back to the late 17th century when several thousand Eastern Orthodox Old Believers, escaping religious persecution in Russia, settled in areas then a part of the Swedish empire near the western coast of Lake Peipus.

In the 18th century, after the Imperial Russian conquest of the northern Baltic region, including Estonia, from Sweden in the Great Northern War (1700–1721), a second period of immigration from Russia followed. Although under the new rule, power in the region remained primarily in the hands of the local Baltic German nobility, but a limited number of administrative jobs was gradually taken over by Russians, who settled in Reval (Tallinn) and other major towns.

A relatively larger number of ethnic Russian workers settled in Tallinn and Narva during the period of rapid industrial development at the end of the 19th century and the beginning of the 20th century. After World War I, the share of ethnic Russians in the population within the boundaries of newly independent Estonia was 7.3%. About half of these were indigenous ethnic Russians living in the Petseri (Pechory) district and east of Narva river ("Estonian Ingria"), in the two areas which had been added to Estonian territory according to the 1920 Peace Treaty of Tartu, but were transferred to the Russian SFSR in 1944.

In the aftermath of World War I Estonia became an independent state where ethnic Russians established Cultural Self-Governments according to the 1925 Estonian Law on Cultural Autonomy. The state was tolerant of the Russian Orthodox Church and became a home to many Russian émigrés after the Russian Revolution in 1917.

World War II and the Soviet occupation 

After the Occupation and annexation of the Baltic states by the Soviet Union in 1940, repression of both ethnic Estonians and ethic Russians followed. According to Sergei Isakov, almost all societies, newspapers, organizations of ethnic Russians in Estonia were closed in 1940 and their activists persecuted. The country remained annexed to the Soviet Union until 1991, except for the period of Nazi German occupation between 1941 and 1944. During the era of Soviet occupation, the Soviet government maintained a program of replacing the indigenous Estonians with immigrants from the Soviet Union. In the course of violent population transfers, thousands of Estonian citizens were deported to the interior parts of Russia (mostly Siberia), and huge numbers of Russian-speaking Soviet citizens were encouraged to settle in Estonia. In the Ida-Viru and Harju Counties, cities such as Paldiski, Sillamäe, and Narva were ethnically cleansed and the indigenous Estonian population was totally replaced by Russian colonists. As a result of Soviet occupation, the Russian population in Estonia grew from about 23,000 people in 1945 to 475,000 in 1991, and other Russian-speaking population to 551,000, constituting 35% of the total population at its peak.

Of the estimated 20,000 Russians remaining in Estonia, the majority belonged to the historical community of Old Believers.

Most of the present-day Russians in Estonia are recent migrants and their descendants who settled in during the Soviet occupation between 1945 and 1991.  After the Soviet Union occupied and annexed Estonia, Latvia and Lithuania in 1940. The Stalinist authorities carried out repressions against many prominent ethnic Russians activists and White emigres in Estonia. Many Russians were arrested and executed by different Soviet war tribunals in 1940–1941. After Germany attacked the Soviet Union in 1941, the Baltic States quickly fell under German control. Many Russians, especially Communist party members who had arrived in the area with the initial occupation and annexation, retreated; those who fell into the German hands were treated harshly, many were executed.

After the war, Narva's inhabitants were for the most part not permitted to return and were replaced by refugees and workers administratively mobilized mostly among Russians, as well as other parts of the Soviet Union. By 1989, ethnic Russians made up 30.3% of the population in Estonia.

During the Singing Revolution, the Intermovement, International Movement of the Workers of the ESSR, organised the local Russian resistance to the independence movement and purported to represent the ethnic Russians and other Russophones in Estonia.

In Estonia with regained independence (1991–present)
Today most Russians live in Tallinn and the major northeastern cities of Narva, Kohtla-Järve, Jõhvi, and Sillamäe. The rural areas are populated almost entirely by ethnic Estonians, except for the coast of Lake Peipus, which has a long history of Old Believers communities. In 2011, University of Tartu sociology professor Marju Lauristin found that 21% were successfully integrated, 28% showed partial integration, and 51% were unintegrated or little integrated.

There are efforts by the Estonian government to improve its tie with the Russian community with former Prime Minister Jüri Ratas learning Russian to better communicate with them. Former President Kersti Kaljulaid is also considered to be a defender of the interests of the Russian-speaking minority, having previously moved to Narva in order to "better understand the people and their problems". The younger generation is better integrated with the rest of the country such as joining the military via conscription and improving their Estonian language skills.

Citizenship
The restored republic recognised citizenship only for the pre-occupation citizens or descendants from such (including the long-term Russian settlers from earlier influxes, such as Lake Peipus coast and the 10,000 residents of the Petseri County), rather than to grant Estonian nationality to all Estonian-resident Soviet citizens. The Citizenship Act provides the following requirements for naturalisation of those people who had arrived in the country after 1940, the majority of whom were ethnic Russians: knowledge of the Estonian language, Constitution and a pledge of loyalty to Estonia. The government offers free preparation courses for the examination on the Constitution and the Citizenship Act, and reimburses up to 380 euros for language studies.

Under the law, residents without citizenship may not elect the Riigikogu (the national parliament) nor the European Parliament, but are eligible to vote in the municipal elections. As of 2 July 2010, 84.1% of Estonian residents are Estonian citizens, 8.6% are citizens of other countries (mainly Russia) and 7.3% are "persons with undetermined citizenship".

Between 1992 and 2007 about 147,000 people acquired Estonian or Russian citizenship, or left the country, bringing the proportion of stateless residents from 32% down to about 8 percent. According to Amnesty International's 2015 report, approximately 6.8% of Estonia's population are not citizens of the country.

In late 2014 an amendment to the law was proposed that would give Estonian citizenship to children of non-citizen parents who have resided in Estonia for at least five years.

Language requirements
The perceived difficulty of the language tests became a point of international contention, as the government of the Russian Federation and a number of human rights organizations objected on the grounds that they made it hard for many Russians who had not learned the language to gain the citizenship in the short term. As a result, the tests were altered somewhat, due to which the number of stateless persons steadily decreased. According to Estonian officials, in 1992, 32% of residents lacked any form of citizenship. In May 2009, the Population register reported that 7.6% of residents have undefined citizenship and 8.4% have foreign citizenship, mostly Russian. As the Russian Federation was recognized as the successor state to the Soviet Union, all former USSR citizens qualified for natural-born citizenship of Russia, available upon mere request, as provided by the law "On the RSFSR Citizenship" in force up to the end of 2000.

Politics
Historically, the Estonian Centre Party has been the most popular party among Russian-speaking citizens. In 2012, it was supported by up to 75% of ethnic non-Estonians.

In 2021, pundits noticed that since 2019 Conservative People's Party of Estonia support grew in the Russian community (notably in Ida-Viru County) This might be attributed to party's social conservative stance on social policy matters.

By county

Notable Russians from Estonia
Wilhelm Küchelbecker (1797–1846), Russian patriotic poet and Decembrist (1825) revolutionary; raised in Estonia.
Leonid Kulik (1883–1942), Russian mineralogist, led the (1927) first Soviet expedition to investigate the Tunguska event; born in Tartu.
Igor Severyanin (Igor Lotaryov, 1887–1941), poet; lived, married, and died in Estonia.
Nikolai Vekšin (1887–1951), sailor, helmsman of the bronze medal winning Estonian 6 Metre boat at 1928 Amsterdam Olympic Games.
Boris Nartsissov (1906–1982), Russian émigré poet; raised and educated in Estonia.
Nikolai Stepulov (1913–1968), won silver medal in boxing, lightweight class at 1936 Summer Olympics in Berlin.
Alexy II of Moscow (Aleksei Rüdiger, 1929–2008), former Patriarch of the Russian Orthodox Church; born and raised in Estonia.
Svetlana Tširkova-Lozovaja (b. 1945), former fencer, representing USSR, won Olympic gold in team foil twice (1968, 1972); lives in Estonia since early age.
Mikhail Veller (b. 1948), Russian writer; works in Tallinn.
Marina Kaljurand (née Rajevskaja, b. 1962), Estonian politician, Member of the European Parliament, former foreign minister.
Anna Levandi (née Kondrashova, b. 1965), former figure skater, representing USSR, won silver at 1984 World Championships; lives in Tallinn.
Valery Karpin (b. 1969), Russian football manager and former player, since 2021 manager of the Russia national team; born in Narva. 
Anton Vaino (b. 1972), chief of staff of the executive office of the President of Russia; born in Tallinn.
Kristina Kallas (b. 1976), Estonian politician, leader of the Estonia 200 political party since its foundation in 2018.
Tatjana Mihhailova-Saar (b. 1983), represented Estonia in the Eurovision Song Contest 2014; lives in Estonia since early age.
Jevgeni Ossinovski (b. 1986), Estonian politician and former leader of the Estonian Social Democratic Party.
Leo Komarov (Leonid Komarov, b. 1987), ice hockey player, representing Finland, 2011 World Champion and 2022 Winter Olympics gold medallist; born in Narva.
Valentina Golubenko (b. 1990), chess Grandmaster, representing Croatia, world champion in girls' U18 category in 2008; lives in Estonia since early age.
Elina Nechayeva (b. 1991), soprano, represented Estonia in the Eurovision Song Contest 2018.

See also 
 Demographics of Estonia
 Estonia–Russia relations 
 Ethnic Russians in post-Soviet states 
 Population transfer in the Soviet Union
 Russification

References

Further reading 
 
 
 
 
 
 
 
 
 
 

 
Estonia–Russia relations
Estonia
Ethnic groups in Estonia
Social history of Estonia